Abdyrova is a rural locality (a village) in Derbishevskoye Rural Settlement of Argayashsky District, Chelyabinsk Oblast, Russia. The population was 245 as of 2010. There are 15 streets.

Geography 
Abdyrova is located on the bank of Maly Kisegach Lake, 18 km southeast of Argayash (the district's administrative centre) by road. Ishalino is the nearest rural locality.

Ethnicity 
The village is inhabited by Bashkirs and others.

References 

Rural localities in Chelyabinsk Oblast